Alex Morgan (born 27 December 1972) is a retired Jamaican middle-distance runner. He competed in the men's 800 metres at the 1996 Summer Olympics.

References

External links
 

1972 births
Living people
Athletes (track and field) at the 1996 Summer Olympics
Jamaican male middle-distance runners
Olympic athletes of Jamaica
Place of birth missing (living people)